Pugliese, meaning of, from or relating to Apulia (Italian Puglia), may refer to:

Pugliese (surname)
Salentino dialect (Italian Pugliese)

Agriculture
 The Apulo-Calabrese breed of pig, also known as the Pugliese

Cuisine
Pizza pugliese 
Apulian or pugliese bread

Military
Pugliese torpedo defense system, named after Umberto Pugliese